Barna Hedenhös uppfinner julen ("The Hedenhös Children invent Christmas") was the Sveriges Television's Christmas calendar in 2013. It was recorded in Stockholm.  Based on the Barna Hedenhös stories set in the Stone Age, the main setting is located to Stockholm in an alternate 2013, where Christmas doesn't exist yet. It won the Kristallen 2014 award as "children and youth programme of the year".

References

External links 
 
 

Fiction set in 2013
2013 Swedish television series debuts
2013 Swedish television series endings
Television series set in prehistory
Television shows set in Stockholm
Sveriges Television's Christmas calendar
Television shows based on children's books
Swedish time travel television series
Fiction about black holes
Television series set in 2013
Alternate history television series
Swedish-language television shows